Atoyac de Álvarez  is one of the 81 municipalities of Guerrero, in south-western Mexico. The municipal seat lies at Atoyac de Álvarez.

Geography

It limits to the north with San Miguel Totolapan, Ajuchitlán del Progreso and General Heliodoro Castillo; to the east with Coyuca de Benítez; to the west with Tecpan de Galeana and to the south with Benito Juárez. The extreme coordinates of the municipality are 17 ° 03 '- 18 ° 32' north latitude, and 100 ° 05 '- 100 ° 34' west longitude.

In 2005, the municipality had a total population of 58,452.

References

Municipalities of Guerrero